Water polo competitions at the 2019 Pan American Games in Lima, Peru were held from July 28 to August 10. The venue for the competition was the water polo pool located at the Villa María del Triunfo cluster. A total of eight men's and eight women's teams (each consisting up to 11 athletes) competed in each tournament. This meant a total of 176 athletes were scheduled to compete.

Roster sizes were dropped from 13 to 11, in line with the decision made by FINA (International Swimming Federation) for the 2020 Summer Olympics.

The top team in each tournament not already qualified for the 2020 Summer Olympics will qualify for the said event.

Competition schedule
The following is the competition schedule for the water polo competitions:

Medal summary

Medal table

Medalists

Qualification
A total of eight men's teams and eight women's team will qualify to compete at the games in each tournament. The host nation (Peru) qualified in each tournament, along with seven other teams in each tournament according to various criteria. Canada and the United States automatically qualified in each tournament, along with the top three teams at the 2018 Central American and Caribbean Games and top two teams at the 2018 South American Championships.

Men

Women

Participating nations
A total of 9 countries qualified water polo teams. 
Argentina qualified a men's team, Venezuela qualified a Women's team, and the other nations qualified both.

References

External links
Results book

Water polo at the 2019 Pan American Games
water polo
2019
2019 in water polo
2019